Scopula ambigua is a moth of the family Geometridae. It was described by Prout in 1935. It is endemic to China.

References

Moths described in 1935
ambigua
Endemic fauna of China
Moths of Asia
Taxa named by Louis Beethoven Prout